Shahpur (Punjabi,), alternatively Shāhpur or Shahapur, is a city and capital of Shahpur Tehsil located in Sargodha District in the Punjab province of Pakistan. It lies on the Jhelum River. Shahpur is distributed in two sectors, Shahpur Sadar and Shahpur City.

In 1893, during the British Raj, Shahpur District was created with Shahpur as the district headquarters. In 1914, the district headquarters were moved from Shahpur to Sargodha, although the district continued to be known as Shahpur. In 1960 however, Sargodha District was created, and Shahpur District became Shahpur Tehsil — one of the tehsils in the district.
A modern police station has been made by Punjab Government.

References

Populated places in Sargodha District
Sargodha District

ca:Districte de Shahpur